The Diocese of San Leone (Latin: Dioecesis Sancti Leonis) was a Roman Catholic diocese located in the Italian town of San Leone in Calabria. In 1547, it was suppressed to the Archdiocese of Trani. It was restored as a titular see in 1966.

History
1322: Established as Diocese of San Leone
1571 November 27: Suppressed to the Archdiocese of Santa Severina
1968: Restored as the Titular Episcopal See of San Leone

Bishops of San Leone
Erected: 1322
Latin Name: Sancti Leonis
Metropolitan: Archdiocese of Santa Severina

...
 Antonius, O.Min. (Roman Obedience) 1402–1404
...
Guberto de Nichesola (22 Apr 1439 Appointed – ) 
...
Giuliano Dati (26 Feb 1518 – 1524 Died)
Francesco Sperelli (19 Jan 1524 – 19 Jan 1526 Resigned) 
Anselmo Sperelli, O.F.M. (19 Jan 1526 – 1531 Resigned)
Avanzio Cricche (18 Jan 1531 – 1535 Died) 
Ottaviano de Castello (8 Jan 1535 – 1542 Died) 
Tommaso Caselli, O.P. (11 Dec 1542 – 27 Oct 1544 Appointed, Bishop of Bertinoro) 
Marco Salvidi (14 Nov 1544 – 1555 Died) 
Giulio Pavesi, O.P. (23 Aug 1555 – 2 Oct 1555 Appointed, Bishop of Vieste) 
Giulio Rossi (23 Oct 1555 – Mar 1564 Died)
Alvaro Magelanes (15 May 1565 – 27 Nov 1571 Died)

27 November 1571: Suppressed to the Archdiocese of Santa Severina

References

Sources
 

Former Roman Catholic dioceses in Italy